Shahriar Shirvand (born March 21, 1991) is an Iranian footballer who currently plays for Shahrdari Ardabil in Azadegan League.

Club career
Shirvand started his senior career at Sepahan.

Club career statistics

 Assist Goals

International
Shirvand participated in the 2008 AFC U-19 Championship. He named in Iran U23 final list for Incheon 2014.

Honours

Club
Sepahan
Iran Pro League (1): 2009–10 
 Runner-up (1): 2007–08

Tractor Sazi
Hazfi Cup (1): 2013–14

Notes

References
 Shahriar Shirvand at Football Federation Islamic Republic of Iran

1991 births
Living people
Sepahan S.C. footballers
People from Ardabil
Iranian footballers
Tractor S.C. players
Machine Sazi F.C. players
Gostaresh Foulad F.C. players
Footballers at the 2014 Asian Games
Shahrdari Ardabil players
Association football midfielders
Asian Games competitors for Iran